Chris Burgess (born 26 November 1995) is a professional Australian rules footballer who plays for the  in the Australian Football League (AFL). He was recruited from West Adelaide Football Club in the 2018 AFL draft as a pre-draft selection. Burgess won the Jim 'Frosty' Miller Medal as the leading goal kicker in the VFL for season 2022.

Statistics
 'Statistics are correct to the end of round 3, 2022

|- style="background-color: #EAEAEA"
! scope="row" style="text-align:center" | 2019
|
| 29 || 14 || 4 || 3 || 55 || 60 || 115 || 38 || 22 || 7 || 0.3 || 0.2 || 3.9 || 4.3 || 8.2 || 2.7 || 1.6 || 0.5
|-
! scope="row" style="text-align:center" | 2020
|
| 29 || 0 || – || – || – || – || – || – || – || – || – || – || – || – || – || – || – || –
|- style="background-color: #EAEAEA"
! scope="row" style="text-align:center" | 2021
|
| 29 || 19 || 10 || 10 || 112 || 62 || 174 || 67 || 42 || 177 || 0.5 || 0.5 || 5.9 || 3.3 || 9.2 || 3.5 || 2.2 || 9.3
|-
! scope="row" style="text-align:center" | 2022
|
| 29 || 0 || – || – || – || – || – || – || – || – || – || – || – || – || – || – || – || –
|- class="sortbottom"
! colspan=3| Career
! 33
! 14
! 13
! 167
! 122
! 289
! 105
! 64
! 184
! 0.4
! 0.4
! 5.1
! 3.7
! 8.8
! 3.2
! 1.9
! 5.6
|}

References

External links

1995 births
Living people
West Adelaide Football Club players
Gold Coast Football Club players
Australian rules footballers from South Australia